Mohammad Said Hamid Junid (17 June 1902 – after 1962), often credited as Moh. Said HJ, was a film director, storywriter, and actor active in the early cinema of Indonesia. After an unsuccessful career in the theatre he directed some nineteen films, beginning with  Boenga Sembodja in 1942.

Early life
Said was born in Rengat, Indragiri, Dutch East Indies, on 17 June 1902. He attended school until age seventeen, when he dropped out and joined a shipping agency. Dissatisfied with this, not long afterwards Said became crew on a merchant freighter, a position which he held for several years. Around 1925, after his ship had landed at Surabaya, Said joined the Sandiwara Royal Poesie Indra Bangsawan drama troupe. Over the next seventeen years he would act with numerous troupes and tour the archipelago, once taking several months to work on a farm. By 1942 his most recent troupe, Boon's Toneel, was closed for showing overly politicised stageplays. Usmar Ismail, later known as a director, suggests that Said saw numerous disappointments during his theatrical career, leading to him often changing troupes.

In 1942, not long after the Japanese occupied the Indies, Said made his directorial debut with Boenga Sembodja, a film featuring music and dance sequences. After this film Said began working with the Japanese, at the Eiga Haykyusha Ai in Bandung, before joining Fred Young's Bintang Surabaja Troupe.

Film career
Said returned to the film industry in the late 1940s, writing and directing Aneka Warna and Menanti Kasih. Aneka Warna was a comedy starring Mochsin and R. Busono which followed two bumbling actors in a search for money. Menanti Kasih, meanwhile, followed a man named Husni Anwar who had to marry his benefactor's daughter to repay a debt of honour; featuring an early song by Bing Slamet, it starred Chatir Harro and Nila Djuwita.

After the Dutch recognised Indonesia's independence in 1949, the country's film industry saw an increase in the number of films. The early 1950s were Said's most productive. Aside from acting in Ratna Asmara's 1952 film Dr Samsi, Said directed sixteen films in six years, writing most and also acting in some of them. These included the dramas Untuk Sang Merah-Putih (1950), which followed a doctor blinded during the national revolution, and Sungai Darah (1954), following a dukun efforts to isolate his community to ensure his own power. Said also continued to direct comedies, including Dunia Gila, which followed a man who becomes his father's uncle-in-law, and Guga Guli (1953), which showed a young prince switching roles with his bodyguard to escape marriage.

By the late 1950s Said's productivity had declined. After Saidjah Putri Pantai in 1956 he wrote only one more film, DKN 901, in 1962. The work, cowritten with Arqamar, followed a young man who takes over command from his father when the latter dies. Said died in Jambi some time after 1962.

Filmography
Said acted in seven films between 1949 and 1962. He had previously made his directorial debut in 1942, directing a total of nineteen films.

Actor

Tjitra (Image; 1949)
Inspektur Rachman (Inspector Rachman; 1950)
Untuk Sang Merah-Putih (For the Red and White; 1950)
Dr Samsi (1952)

Saputangan Sutra (Silk Glove; 1953)
Djaja Merana (1954)
Sampah (Garbage; 1955)
Dibalik Dinding Sekolah (Behind the School Walls; 1961)

Crew

Boenga Sembodja (Plumeria; 1942) – Director
Aneka Warna (Many Colours; 1949) – Director and story
Menanti Kasih (Waiting for Lover; 1949) – Director and story
Inspektur Rachman (Inspector Rachman; 1950) – Director
Pantai Bahagia (Happy Beach; 1950) – Director
Untuk Sang Merah-Putih (For the Red and White; 1950) – Director
Bakti Bahagia (Happy Duty; 1951) – Director
Dunia Gila (Crazy World; 1951) – Director
Surjani Mulia (The Great Surjani; 1951) – Director and story
Pahlawan (Hero; 1951) – Director and story

Rumah Hantu (Ghost House; 1951) – Director and story
Guga Guli (1953) – Director and story
Kemajoran (1953) – Director
Srigala Topeng Hitam (Wolf in the Black Mask; 1953) – Director
Djaja Merana (1954) – Director and story
Sungai Darah (River of Blood; 1954) – Director
Tengah Malam (Midnight; 1954) – Director and story
Sampah (Garbage; 1955) – Director
Saidjah Putri Pantai (Saidjah the Beach Maiden; 1956) – Director and story
DKN 901 (1962) – Story

References
Footnotes

Bibliography

External links

People from Indragiri Hulu Regency
Film directors of the Dutch East Indies
Screenwriters of the Dutch East Indies
Indonesian film directors
Indonesian screenwriters
1902 births
Year of death uncertain
Year of death missing